Anarithma sublachryma is a species of sea snail, a marine gastropod mollusk in the family Mitromorphidae.

Description
The length of the shell varies between 3.5 mm and 7 mm.

Distribution
This marine species occurs off Papua New Guinea and New Caledonia

References

 Hervier, J., 1900. - Le genre Columbella dans l'archipel de la Nouvelle-Calédonie. Journal de Conchyliologie 47(1899): 305-391
 Fischer-Piette, E., 1950. - Liste des types décrits dans le Journal de Conchyliologie et conservés dans la collection de ce journal (avec planches)(suite). Journal de Conchyliologie 90: 149-180

External links
 MNHN, Paris: Anarithma sublachryma
 

sublachryma
Gastropods described in 1900